Frank Area Godchaux Jr. (December 27, 1901 – November 4, 1978) was an American football and baseball player and golfer for the Vanderbilt Commodores of Vanderbilt University.

Early years
Frank Area Godchaux Jr. was born on December 27, 1901, in Abbeville, Louisiana, to Frank Godchaux Sr. His father was a letterman and quarterback for the Commodores on the 1899 team, transferring from LSU in 1897, and once President of the Louisiana Rice Milling Company, a $10,000,000 corporation.

Vanderbilt University

Godchaux Hall at Vanderbilt University was named for his wife, Mary Ragland Godchaux. A Gothic building constructed in 1925 as a home for the School of Nursing, it now houses faculty and administrative offices, the Center for Nursing Research, and the Helene Fuld Multimedia Center. It was named for Mary Ragland in 1971.

1921
He was a member of the 1921 Southern Intercollegiate Athletic Association (SIAA) champion football and baseball teams.

Football
Godchaux was a prominent running back for Dan McGugin's Vanderbilt Commodores football teams. On the 1921 football team Godchaux was its second leading scorer behind Rupert Smith. Godchaux was the first son to follow in his father's footsteps as a Vanderbilt football player.

Baseball
On the 1921 baseball team, Frank Jr. was a catcher.

See also
Detailed and extensive document of the cattle farms of Frank A. Godchaux Jr. and Sr. in Vermilion Parish.

References

External links

1901 births
1978 deaths
American football halfbacks
American football quarterbacks
Players of American football from Louisiana
Baseball players from Louisiana
Baseball catchers
Vanderbilt Commodores baseball players
Vanderbilt Commodores football players
People from Abbeville, Louisiana